Millville is a city in Cache County, Utah, United States. The population was 2,222 at the 2020 census, with an estimated population of 2,300 in 2022. It is included in the Logan, Utah-Idaho Metropolitan Statistical Area.

Geography
Millville is located on the southeast side of Cache Valley in northern Utah and is bordered by Providence to the north, Logan to the northwest, and Nibley to the southwest.

Climate
The climate in this area has mild differences between highs and lows, and there is adequate rainfall year-round.  According to the Köppen Climate Classification system, Millville has a marine west coast climate, abbreviated "CFB" on climate maps.

History

George White Pitkin built the first log home in Millville, before the settlement was organized or named. He and his sons, Ammon Paul Pitkin and George Orrin Pitkin, built the home in 1859. The family moved into it in late spring 1860. The present location of the home is 136 W. 100 South, in Millville. It became the Pitkin homestead. Church and school were held there. As George White Pitkin was an educated man, he taught until a "proper" church and school were built. George died at the age of 72 on November 26, 1873, and is buried in the Millville cemetery.

Demographics

At the 2000 census, there were 1,507 people, 395 households and 361 families residing in the city. The racial makeup of the city was 96.75% White, 0.40% Native American, 0.33% Asian, 1.59% from other races, and 0.93% from two or more races. Hispanic or Latino of any race were 2.12% of the population.

There were 395 households, of which 59.5% had children under the age of 18 living with them, 83.5% were married couples living together, 6.3% had a female householder with no husband present, and 8.4% were non-families. 7.6% of all households were made up of individuals, and 2.8% had someone living alone who was 65 years of age or older. The average household size was 3.82 and the average family size was 4.02.

39.2% of the population were under the age of 18, 12.8% from 18 to 24, 25.3% from 25 to 44, 18.2% from 45 to 64, and 4.6% who were 65 years of age or older. The median age was 23 years. For every 100 females, there were 102.3 males. For every 100 females age 18 and over, there were 103.3 males.

The median household income was $51,513 and the median family income was $52,813. Males had a median income of $32,969 and females $22,500. The per capita income was $13,977. About 2.7% of families and 3.1% of the population were below the poverty line, including 2.2% of those under age 18 and 6.8% of those age 65 or over.

Notable people
 Craig Jessop, director of the Mormon Tabernacle Choir
 Joseph Smith Jessop, polygamist patriarch

References

External links
City of Millville official website

Cities in Cache County, Utah
Cities in Utah
Logan metropolitan area
Populated places established in 1860